Yi-Ju Christopher Wang, commonly known as Chris Wang (born May 15, 1977) is an African National Congress member of the National Assembly of South Africa. He was the youngest MP of the country when elected in 2004.

He is of one of three Members of Parliament of Chinese descent, the others being Eugenia Chang of the Inkatha Freedom Party, and Shiaan-Bin Huang of the ANC.

Early life 
Wang was born and raised in Taiwan. He immigrated to South Africa at the age of 30.

References

External links
 Chris Wang MP
 Parliament of South Africa Profile
 Independent Online News
 University of Cape Town Monday Paper

South African politicians of Chinese descent
1977 births
Living people
South African people of Chinese descent
African National Congress politicians
Members of the National Assembly of South Africa